Duck Creek Township is a township in Stoddard County, in the U.S. state of Missouri.

Duck Creek Township was erected in 1850, taking its name from Duck Creek.

References

Townships in Missouri
Townships in Stoddard County, Missouri
1850 establishments in Missouri